2005 Karachi local government elections were the first Karachi local government elections to elect a mayor and a local council.

Voting 
In contrast to latest elections held in 2015, the mayors were elected in CDGK by direct voting of all elected counsellors. Each union council consisted of 13 members, which gave a total electorate of 2,314 members from 178 union councils.

Result 

The 2005 local government elections individual results are based on claims made by various parties; the official result has not remained as a part of the Election Commission of Pakistan's record.

The following party results are only based on estimate and is not a definite result.

References 

Elections in Karachi
2005 in Pakistan
August 2005 events in Pakistan